Garstang Town railway station served the market town of Garstang in Lancashire, England. It opened in 1870. The station closed for passengers in 1930 and for freight in 1965.

History 
The station opened on 5 December 1870 by the Garstang and Knot-End Railway. It was situated on the west side of the B6430. To the south was a goods shed and an engine shed; to the north was a carriage shed. The station was rebuilt in 1909 with two platforms: one on the left and an island platform, a station building on the island platform, a signal box to the west, a two-road engine shed to the northwest, and new carriage sheds to the northeast. 'Town' was added to its name on 2 July 1924. The station closed to passengers on 31 March 1930. It closed to goods on 16 August 1965. The site was later developed into housing.

References

External links 

Disused railway stations in the Borough of Wyre
Railway stations in Great Britain opened in 1870
Railway stations in Great Britain closed in 1872
Railway stations in Great Britain opened in 1875
Railway stations in Great Britain closed in 1930
Buildings and structures in Garstang
1870 establishments in England
1965 disestablishments in England